East Midlands/Leicestershire 4 was a tier 13 English Rugby Union league with teams from Bedfordshire, parts of Cambridgeshire, Leicestershire and Northamptonshire taking part.  Promoted teams moved up to East Midlands/Leicestershire 3 and there was no relegation.  At the end of the 1995–96 season the division was cancelled following the splitting of the East Midlands and Leicestershire leagues.

Original teams

When this division was introduced in 1992 as part of a merger of the East Midlands and Leicestershire leagues it contained the following teams:

Braunstone Town - N/A (new to league system)
Clapham Town - N/A (new to league system)
Corby - transferred from East Midlands 2 (11th)
Kempston - transferred from East Midlands 3 (2nd)
Littlehey - transferred from East Midlands 3 (7th)
Northampton Heathens - transferred from East Midlands 3 (4th)
Potton - transferred from East Midlands 3 (8th)
Thorney - transferred from East Midlands 3 (6th)
Vauxhall Motors - transferred from East Midlands 3 (3rd)

East Midlands/Leicestershire 4 honours

East Midlands/Leicestershire 4 (1992–1993)

The original East Midlands/Leicestershire 4 was a tier 12 league.  Promotion was to East Midlands/Leicestershire 3 and there was no relegation.

East Midlands/Leicestershire 4 (1993–1996)

The top six teams from Midlands 1 and the top six from North 1 were combined to create National 5 North, meaning that East Midlands/Leicestershire 4 dropped another level to become a tier 13 league.  Promotion continued to East Midlands/Leicestershire 3 and there was no relegation.  The division was cancelled at the end of the 1995–96 season due to the splitting of the East Midlands and Leicestershire leagues.

Number of league titles

Burbage (1)
Kempston (1)
Loughborough Students (1)
Vauxhall Motors (1)

Notes

See also
East Midlands/Leicestershire 1
East Midlands/Leicestershire 2
East Midlands/Leicestershire 3
Midlands RFU
East Midlands RFU
Leicestershire RU
English rugby union system
Rugby union in England

References

External links
 East Midlands Rugby Union official website
Leicestershire Rugby Union website

Defunct rugby union leagues in England
Rugby union in Bedfordshire
Rugby union in Cambridgeshire
Rugby union in Leicestershire
Rugby union in Northamptonshire
Sports leagues established in 1992
Sports leagues disestablished in 1996